House on the Hill is a 2012 American horror film directed by Jeffrey Frentzen and based on the real-life killing spree of serial killers Leonard Lake and Charles Ng. The film had its world premiere on May 11, 2012 at the Monaco Charity Film Festival and was released to DVD in the United Kingdom and United States in 2015. In the United Kingdom, 7 minutes and 12 seconds were cut from the film by the British Board of Film Classification in order to obtain an 18 rating.

Synopsis
Sonia (Naidra Dawn Thomson) is the only known survivor of the serial killer Leonard Lake. She's paired up with a private investigator in the hopes of finding a lost woman and during their exploration of Lake's compound, she tells the investigator about how she was tortured and forced to videotape the rape, torture, and murder of another woman.

Cast
Naidra Dawn Thomson as Sonia
Shannon Leade as Karianna
Stephen A.F. Day as Leonard Lake
Sam Leung as Charles Ng
Kevin McCloskey as Paul Kale
Laura Hofrichter as Sara (as Laura Leigh)
Brenna Catherine Briski as Leila
Crystal Nelson	as Jennifer
Tya Adams as Sandra
Olivia Parrish as Julie
Rachael Devlin as Cat
Elissa Dowling as Mary

Reception
HorrorNews.net and Bloody Disgusting both panned the film, criticizing it for what they saw as poor plotting and acting. Ain't It Cool News was more positive in their review, praising the performances of Day and Leung while overall stating "while the filmmakers had some disquieting inspiration to build a movie on, HOUSE ON THE HILL is just too low fi to be effective in any way."

References

External links
 
 

2012 films
2012 horror films
2010s biographical films
2012 independent films
American biographical films
American horror films
American independent films
Biographical films about serial killers
Horror films based on actual events
Films about rape
American serial killer films
Crime films based on actual events
Crime horror films
Cultural depictions of male serial killers
Cultural depictions of rapists
Cultural depictions of kidnappers
Cultural depictions of American men
Films scored by Robert J. Walsh
Censored films
2010s English-language films
2010s American films